Antwerpen-Berchem is a railway station in the south of the city of Antwerp, Antwerp, Belgium. The station opened on 1 March 1865 and currently serves railway lines 25, 27, 27A and 59.

History 
From opening until 1975, the station was simply known as Berchem, later changing to Berchem (Antwerpen), at a time that international trains stopped here instead of Antwerpen Oost. In 1983, when Berchem and Antwerpen became one city, the station was renamed Antwerpen-Berchem.

International Thalys and Benelux services (from Amsterdam to Brussels and Paris) stopped calling at this station, following the opening of the North-South tunnel under Antwerpen-Centraal. Since December 2014, the Benelux service (Amsterdam - Brussels) calls at the station again.

Train services
The following services currently the serve the station:

Intercity services (IC-02) Antwerp - Sint-Niklaas - Gent - Bruges - Ostend
Intercity services (IC-04) Antwerp - Sint-Niklaas - Gent - Kortrijk - Poperinge/Lille
Intercity services (IC-05) Antwerp - Mechelen - Brussels - Nivelles - Charleroi (weekdays)
Intercity services (IC-08) Antwerp - Mechelen - Brussels Airport - Leuven - Hasselt
Intercity services (IC-09) Antwerp - Lier - Aarschot - Leuven (weekdays)
Intercity services (IC-09) Antwerp - Lier - Aarschot - Hasselt - Liege (weekends)
Intercity services (IC-10) Antwerp - Mol - Hamont/Hasselt
Intercity services (IC-22) Essen - Antwerp - Mechelen - Brussels (weekdays)
Intercity services (IC-22) Antwerp - Mechelen - Brussels - Binche (weekends)
Intercity services (IC-28) Antwerp - Sint-Niklaas - Gent (weekdays)
Intercity services (IC-30) Antwerp - Herentals - Turnhout
Intercity services (IC-31) Antwerp - Mechelen - Brussels - Nivelles - Charleroi (weekends)
Intercity services (IC-35) Amsterdam - The Hague - Rotterdam - Roosendaal - Antwerp - Brussels Airport - Brussels
Local services (L-22) Roosendaal - Essen - Antwerp - Puurs (weekdays)
Local services (L-23) Antwerp - Aarschot - Leuven
Local services (L-24) Antwerp - Herentals - Mol (weekdays)
Local services (L-30) Antwerp - Lokeren
Brussels RER services (S1) Antwerp - Mechelen - Brussels - Waterloo - Nivelles (weekdays)
Brussels RER services (S1) Antwerp - Mechelen - Brussels (weekends)

Tram services
Tram lines 4, 9 and 11 serve the station, these are operated by De Lijn.

Bus services
Bus services 20, 21, 30, 32, 38, 51, 52, 53, 90, 91, 92, 93, 298, 420, 421 and 422 serve the station, these are operated by De Lijn.

References

Belgian Railways website
De Lijn website

Railway stations opened in 1865
Railway stations in Belgium
Railway stations in Antwerp
Public transport in Antwerp
Buildings and structures in Antwerp